Białobrzezie  (German: Rothschloss) is a village in the administrative district of Gmina Kondratowice, within Strzelin County, Lower Silesian Voivodeship, in south-western Poland.

In Białobrzezie there is a historic manor house of the Piast dynasty and a park dating back to the 16th century.

Before 1945 the village was German-settled and part of the German state of Prussia, Province of Lower Silesia.

References

Villages in Strzelin County